Massacre in the Black Forest is a 1967 historical drama film set on the northeast frontier of the Roman Empire facing the area of Germania in A.D. 9.  The film centers on Arminius, a chieftain of the Cherusci Germanic tribe (in what is now Lower Saxony), who drew three Roman legions into an ambush in the Teutoburg Forest, known as the Battle of the Teutoburg Forest.

Cast

Release
The film was released in 1967.

Footnotes

References

See also
In the Shadow of the Eagles (dir. Ferdinando Baldi, 1966), with Cameron Mitchell, Beba Lončar, Dieter Eppler, Peter Carsten
List of historical drama films
List of films set in ancient Rome
List of German films: 1960s
Battle of the Teutoburg Forest

External links
Stefan Noack: "Gebt mir meine Millionen wieder!" Der Spielfilm "Hermann der Cherusker" als Beispiel einer multinationalen Varusschlacht-Adaption in den 1960er u. 1970er Jahren, Berlin 2012. 
 
 Trailer on YouTube 

1967 films
1960s historical films
Italian historical films
German historical films
Peplum films
West German films
1960s Italian-language films
1960s German-language films
Films set in ancient Rome
Films set in the Roman Empire
Classical war films
Films set in Germany
Films directed by Ferdinando Baldi
Films scored by Carlo Savina
Films set in the 1st century
Sword and sandal films
1960s German films
German epic films
1960s Italian films